rdGizmo For You LTD is in Larnaca, Cyprus. Initially manufactured and sold electronic devices based on member ideas and suggestions in a form of "Wishes". Currently the organization is focused on a single project under the name OSRC (Open Source Remote Control) which it designed and created.

History
rdGizmo For You LTD was founded in 2007 by Demetris Rouslan Zavorotnitsienko, the CEO and Lead developer of the organization. Its first products were GPS trackers and hand-held PDA's as well as many other devices which were all Open Source and available to the public for download or modifications. The name Gizmo For You came about because the company creates Gizmos and naturally For You relates to everyone since anyone can participate or initiate a project.

In late 2011 the CEO and founder of the organization, created a device under the name OSRC (Open Source Remote Control). Based on these designs the company redirected all its resources towards the project, recreating the web space to accommodate the newly developed series of products and their community. All past designs, made by Gizmo For You were transferred to the OSRC website and are hosted there for historical reasons.

In 2013 a need for a 3D printer became clear for the OSRC project and the company created the Ilios 3D printer. Unfortunately due to lack of financing, the OSRC project was suspended and the Ilios 3D printer website was created and separated from the OSRC project. Currently the company is mainly concentrated on developing and supporting the Ilios 3D printer.

External links
 Ilios 3D Printer Website
 OSRC Website

Electronic kit manufacturers
Free software project foundations
Electronic design automation companies